Sibselmash is a bandy club from Novosibirsk, Russia. The team plays in the top Russian bandy league, the Super League. It was founded in 1937 and subsequently reestablished in 1974. The club colours are red and blue.

Honours

Domestic
 Russian Champions:
 Winners (1): 1995
 Runners-up (4): 1994, 1996, 1997, 1998

Sibselmash-2
Sibselmash's second team Sibselmash-2 plays in the Russian Bandy Supreme League, the second tier of Russian bandy.

In culture
The team's stadium is mentioned in the song Sibselmash by the post-punk band Ploho ("Dormitory, sixth floor, second building from Sibselmash Stadium").

References

External links
 Official club website (in Russian)

Bandy clubs in Russia
Bandy clubs in the Soviet Union
Sport in Novosibirsk
Bandy clubs established in 1937
1937 establishments in Russia
Bandy clubs established in 1974
1974 establishments in Russia